Sep is a masculine given name and nickname, often a short form of Septimus. It may refer to:

 Sepandar Kamvar (born 1977), American computer scientist, artist, author and entrepreneur
 Sep Lambert (1876–1959), Irish cricketer
 Sep Ledger (1889–1917), South African rugby union player
 Sep Ruf (1908–1982), German architect and designer
 Sep E. Scott (1879–1965), British painter, illustrator and comics artist
 Sep Smith (1912–2006), English footballer
 Sep Vanmarcke (born 1988), Belgian road racing cyclist
 Sep Visser (born 1990), Dutch international rugby union player

Masculine given names
Hypocorisms
Lists of people by nickname